In tennis, Prague Open may refer to:

 Prague Open (1987–1999)
 ATP Prague Open
 WTA Prague Open
 Sparta Prague Open Challenger